Diadegma cinnabaritor is a wasp first described by Aubert in 1970.
No subspecies are listed.

References

cinnabaritor
Insects described in 1970